This is a list of moths of the family Gracillariidae that are found in India. It also acts as an index to the species articles and forms part of the full List of moths of India.

Acrocercops allactopa Meyrick, 1916
Acrocercops amethystopa Meyrick, 1916
Acrocercops anthracuris Meyrick, 1926
Acrocercops argyraspis Meyrick, 1908
Acrocercops astiopa Meyrick, 1930
Acrocercops auricilla (Stainton, 1859)
Acrocercops barringtoniella (van Deventer, 1904)
Acrocercops bifrenis Meyrick, 1918
Acrocercops calycophthalma Meyrick, 1926
Acrocercops chrysargyra Meyrick, 1908
Acrocercops chrysophila Meyrick, 1937
Acrocercops chrysoplitis Meyrick, 1937
Acrocercops citrodora Meyrick, 1914
Acrocercops clepsinoma Meyrick, 1916
Acrocercops convoluta Meyrick, 1908
Acrocercops cornicina Meyrick, 1908
Acrocercops crystallopa Meyrick, 1916
Acrocercops cyanodeta Meyrick, 1918
Acrocercops cylicota Meyrick, 1914
Acrocercops defigurata Meyrick, 1928
Acrocercops diacentrota Meyrick, 1935
Acrocercops diatonica Meyrick, 1916
Acrocercops epiclina Meyrick, 1918
Acrocercops eranista Meyrick, 1918
Acrocercops erioplaca Meyrick, 1918
Acrocercops euthycolona Meyrick, 1931
Acrocercops extenuata Meyrick, 1916
Acrocercops galeopa Meyrick, 1908
Acrocercops hapalarga Meyrick, 1916
Acrocercops helicopa Meyrick, 1919
Acrocercops hemiglypta Meyrick, 1916
Acrocercops hexachorda Meyrick, 1914
Acrocercops hierocosma Meyrick, 1912
Acrocercops hormista Meyrick, 1916
Acrocercops hyphantica Meyrick, 1912
Acrocercops irradians Meyrick, 1931
Acrocercops lenticulata Meyrick, 1922
Acrocercops leucophaea Meyrick, 1919
Acrocercops lithochalca Meyrick, 1930
Acrocercops loxias Meyrick, 1918
Acrocercops lysibathra Meyrick, 1916
Acrocercops macroclina Meyrick, 1916
Acrocercops macroplaca Meyrick, 1908
Acrocercops mantica Meyrick, 1908
Acrocercops mechanopla Meyrick, 1934
Acrocercops melanoplecta Meyrick, 1908
Acrocercops myriogramma Meyrick, 1937
Acrocercops niphocremna Meyrick, 1932
Acrocercops nitidula (Stainton, 1862)
Acrocercops ochronephela Meyrick, 1908
Acrocercops orbifera Meyrick, 1908
Acrocercops ortholocha Meyrick, 1908
Acrocercops orthostacta Meyrick, 1918
Acrocercops paliacma Meyrick, 1930
Acrocercops patricia Meyrick, 1908
Acrocercops pentalocha Meyrick, 1912
Acrocercops petalopa Meyrick, 1934
Acrocercops phaeomorpha Meyrick, 1919
Acrocercops phaeospora Meyrick, 1916
Acrocercops pharopeda Meyrick, 1916
Acrocercops polyclasta Meyrick, 1919
Acrocercops praeclusa Meyrick, 1914
Acrocercops prompta Meyrick, 1916
Acrocercops psaliodes Meyrick, 1926
Acrocercops quadrisecta Meyrick, 1932
Acrocercops rhothogramma T. B. Fletcher, 1933
Acrocercops sauropis Meyrick, 1908
Acrocercops scandalota Meyrick, 1914
Acrocercops scenias Meyrick, 1914
Acrocercops scoliograpta Meyrick, 1922
Acrocercops scriptulata Meyrick, 1916
Acrocercops selmatica Meyrick, 1918
Acrocercops sporograpta Meyrick, 1932
Acrocercops strophala Meyrick, 1908
Acrocercops supplex Meyrick, 1918
Acrocercops telestis Meyrick, 1911
Acrocercops tenera Meyrick, 1914
Acrocercops terminaliae (Stainton, 1862)
Acrocercops tetradeta Meyrick, 1926
Acrocercops thrylodes Meyrick, 1930
Acrocercops thylacaula Meyrick, 1932
Acrocercops tricyma Meyrick, 1908
Acrocercops triscalma Meyrick, 1916
Acrocercops trissoptila Meyrick, 1921
Acrocercops ustulatella (Stainton, 1859)
Acrocercops vanula Meyrick, 1912
Acrocercops viatica Meyrick, 1916
Acrocercops zopherandra Meyrick, 1931
Acrocercops zygonoma Meyrick, 1921
Artifodina strigulata Kumata, 1985
Borboryctis triplaca (Meyrick, 1908)
Caloptilia acinata Yuan & Robinson, 1993
Caloptilia aeolocentra (Meyrick, 1922)
Caloptilia argalea (Meyrick, 1908)
Caloptilia ariana (Meyrick, 1914)
Caloptilia auspex (Meyrick, 1912)
Caloptilia baringi Yuan & Robinson, 1993
Caloptilia citrochrysa (Meyrick, 1930)
Caloptilia clastopetra (Meyrick, 1928)
Caloptilia deltosticta (Meyrick, 1933)
Caloptilia eurycryptis (Meyrick, 1928)
Caloptilia hemiconis (Meyrick, 1894)
Caloptilia heterocosma (Meyrick, 1931)
Caloptilia iridophanes (Meyrick, 1935)
Caloptilia isochrysa (Meyrick, 1908)
Caloptilia leucolitha (Meyrick, 1912)
Caloptilia mastopis (Meyrick, 1918)
Caloptilia megalotis (Meyrick, 1908)
Caloptilia metadoxa (Meyrick, 1908)
Caloptilia octopunctata (Turner, 1894)
Caloptilia oxydelta (Meyrick, 1908)
Caloptilia parasticta (Meyrick, 1908)
Caloptilia perisphena (Meyrick, 1905)
Caloptilia porphyracma (Meyrick, 1922)
Caloptilia protiella (van Deventer, 1904)
Caloptilia pterostoma (Meyrick, 1922)
Caloptilia recitata (Meyrick, 1918)
Caloptilia scaeodesma (Meyrick, 1928)
Caloptilia scansoria (Meyrick, 1910)
Caloptilia soyella (van Deventer, 1904)
Caloptilia stigmatella (Fabricius, 1781)
Caloptilia syrphetias (Meyrick, 1907)
Caloptilia teleodelta (Meyrick, 1926)
Caloptilia theivora (Walsingham, 1891)
Caloptilia thymophanes (Meyrick, 1928)
Caloptilia trissochroa (Meyrick, 1931)
Caloptilia zachrysa (Meyrick, 1907)
Caloptilia zonotarsa (Meyrick, 1936)
Calybites phasianipennella (Hübner, [1813])
Cameraria bauhiniae (Stainton, 1856)
Cameraria magnisignata Kumata, 1993
Cameraria virgulata (Meyrick, 1914)
Conopomorpha cramerella (Snellen, 1904)
Conopomorpha litchiella Bradley, 1986
Conopomorpha sinensis Bradley, 1986
Cryptolectica ensiformis (Yuan, 1986)
Cryptologa nystalea T. B. Fletcher, 1921
Cuphodes plexigrapha (Meyrick, 1916)
Cuphodes profluens (Meyrick, 1916)
Cyphosticha pterocola Meyrick, 1914
Dekeidoryxis asynacta (Meyrick, 1918)
Dekeidoryxis maesae Kumata, 1989
Deoptilia syrista (Meyrick, 1926)
Dialectica aemula (Meyrick, 1916)
Dialectica geometra (Meyrick, 1916)
Ectropina acidula (Meyrick, 1911)
Ectropina raychaudhurii Kumata, 1979
Epicephala albifrons (Stainton, 1859)
Epicephala ancylopa Meyrick, 1918
Epicephala bromias Meyrick, 1910
Epicephala calasiris Meyrick, 1908
Epicephala orientale (Stainton, 1856)
Epicephala sphenitis Meyrick, 1931
Epicephala stauropa Meyrick, 1908
Epicephala strepsiploca Meyrick, 1918
Epicephala subtilis Meyrick, 1922
Eteoryctis deversa (Meyrick, 1922)
Eteoryctis gemoniella (Stainton, 1862)
Eteoryctis syngramma (Meyrick, 1914)
Gibbovalva civica (Meyrick, 1914)
Gibbovalva quadrifasciata (Stainton, 1862)
Gibbovalva urbana (Meyrick, 1908)
Ketapangia leucochorda (Meyrick, 1908)
Liocrobyla paraschista Meyrick, 1916
Macarostola callischema Meyrick, 1908
Macarostola coccinea (Walsingham, 1900)
Macarostola haemataula Meyrick, 1912
Macarostola tegulata Meyrick, 1908
Macarostola zehntneri (Snellen, 1902)
Melanocercops cyclopa (Meyrick, 1908)
Melanocercops desiccata (Meyrick, 1916)
Melanocercops elaphopa (Meyrick, 1914)
Melanocercops ficuvorella (Yazaki, 1926)
Melanocercops phractopa (Meyrick, 1918)
Monocercops resplendens (Stainton, 1862)
Parectopa capnias Meyrick, 1908
Parectopa oxysphena Meyrick, 1934
Parectopa promylaea (Meyrick, 1817)
Parornix concussa (Meyrick, 1933)
Phodoryctis caerulea (Meyrick, 1912)
Phrixosceles hydrocosma Meyrick, 1908
Phrixosceles phricotarsa Meyrick, 1916
Phrixosceles pteridograpta Meyrick, 1935
Phrixosceles trochosticha Meyrick, 1908
Phyllocnistis amydropa Meyrick, 1934
Phyllocnistis argothea Meyrick, 1933
Phyllocnistis chrysophthalma Meyrick, 1915
Phyllocnistis cirrhophanes Meyrick, 1915
Phyllocnistis citrella Stainton, 1856
Phyllocnistis citronympha Meyrick, 1926
Phyllocnistis echinodes Meyrick, 1926
Phyllocnistis endoxa Meyrick, 1926
Phyllocnistis exaeta Meyrick, 1926
Phyllocnistis habrochroa Meyrick, 1915
Phyllocnistis hagnopa Meyrick, 1920
Phyllocnistis helicodes Meyrick, 1916
Phyllocnistis lucernifera Meyrick, 1935
Phyllocnistis micrographa Meyrick, 1916
Phyllocnistis oxyopa Meyrick, 1918
Phyllocnistis phrixopa Meyrick, 1926
Phyllocnistis saligna (Zeller, 1839)
Phyllocnistis signata Meyrick, 1915
Phyllocnistis spatulata Meyrick, 1928
Phyllocnistis stereograpta Meyrick, 1934
Phyllocnistis symphanes Meyrick, 1926
Phyllocnistis synglypta Meyrick, 1918
Phyllocnistis toparcha Meyrick, 1918
Phyllocnistis triploca Meyrick, 1928
Phyllonorycter acratynta (Meyrick, 1916)
Phyllonorycter clepsiphaga (Meyrick, 1922)
Phyllonorycter conformis (Meyrick, 1910)
Phyllonorycter conista (Meyrick, 1911)
Phyllonorycter drepanota (Meyrick, 1928)
Phyllonorycter epichares (Meyrick, 1928)
Phyllonorycter eratantha (Meyrick, 1922)
Phyllonorycter fasciformis (Meyrick, 1930)
Phyllonorycter ganodes (Meyrick, 1918)
Phyllonorycter hapalotoxa (Meyrick, 1921)
Phyllonorycter incurvata (Meyrick, 1916)
Phyllonorycter iochrysis (Meyrick, 1931)
Phyllonorycter iteina (Meyrick, 1918)
Phyllonorycter philerasta (Meyrick, 1922)
Phyllonorycter triarcha (Meyrick, 1908)
Phyllonorycter triplex (Meyrick, 1914)
Phyllonorycter zonochares (Meyrick, 1933)
Porphyrosela dorinda (Meyrick, 1912)
Porphyrosela neodoxa (Meyrick, 1916)
Spulerina astaurota (Meyrick, 1922)
Spulerina dissotoma (Meyrick, 1931)
Spulerina isonoma (Meyrick, 1916)
Spulerina malicola (Meyrick, 1921)
Stomphastis chalybacma (Meyrick, 1908)
Stomphastis labyrinthica (Meyrick, 1918)
Stomphastis thraustica (Meyrick, 1908)
Synnympha perfrenis Meyrick, 1920
Telamoptilia cathedraea (Meyrick, 1908)
Telamoptilia hemistacta (Meyrick, 1924)
Telamoptilia prosacta (Meyrick, 1918)

See also 
List of moths of India

References

 
x
M